José de Jesús Angulo del Valle y Navarro (June 24, 1888 − September 19, 1966) was a Mexican Roman Catholic bishop.

Ordained to the priesthood in November 19, 1916, Angulo del Valle y Navarro was named bishop of the Roman Catholic Diocese of Tabasco, Mexico in 1945 and died in 1966 while still in office.

References

1888 births
1966 deaths
People from Jalisco
Roman Catholic bishops of Tabasco
20th-century Roman Catholic bishops in Mexico

As far as the "History of the construction of the Temple of the Sacred Heart of Jesus" some people have approached to ask who was this character who played such an important role in the resumption of the works and the definitive image of that majestic sanctuary of the Apaseoaltenses. Here is a brief review of his life and work.

Monsignor José de Jesús Angulo y Navarro, better known as José del Valle, was born on June 24, 1888 in the Hacienda del Valle, in the Altos de Jalisco. Son of Don Marciano Angulo and Ramona Navarro, owners of the Hacienda, located within the jurisdiction of Atotonilco, the heart of the Altos de Jalisco.

He completed his first studies in Atotonilco, standing out as a high achievement student, by virtue of which his parents enrolled him in the Seminary of San Juan de los Lagos where he finished his studies in humanities and on October 18, 1905 he entered the Conciliar Seminary from Guadalajara to culminate with his studies of Philosophy and Sacred Theology. On Holy Wednesday, March 19, 1913, he received the tonsure at the hands of Mr. Francisco Orozco y Jiménez, Bishop of Guadalajara.

In 1914 he asked his uncles for permission to build an Oratory on his parents' land: La Estanzuela. Once the authorization of the Sagrada Mitra was obtained, in May of that year it began to build it and at the end of July Mr. Cura Jiménez went to place the cornerstone. In September 1914 the Oratory was completed and on October 6 the Dedication of the same was given in the hands of Fr. Donaciano Ruvalcaba. Thus was born what would later become the Vicarage and now the Parish of San Francisco de Asís.

In the middle of Carrancismo, with many bitternesses for the church, he spent the rest of the year 1914, 1915 and part of 1916 teaching the doctrine to the children of La Estanzuela and surrounding ranches, having El Refugio as the center of operations, formerly called Mariche where his parents had been born.

During the last days of October 1916, he was called to Guadalajara to do his spiritual exercises prior to his priestly ordination. On November 1, he received the four minor orders in the Iglesia del Pilar; on Sunday 5 of the same he received the subdiaconate; on Sunday the 12th the diaconate and on Sunday the 19th he was ordained a priest in the Chapel of the Trinity in the city of Guadalajara.

On November 21, he was notified of the date to sing his first mass and was informed that among other reasons, as he was very fond of horseback riding, he would be designated to go to Totatiche. In those days he bought a statuette of Señor San José and took it to La Estanzuela where he himself had made an Oratory where on November 28 he solemnly sang his first mass.
On November 29, 1916, he received his first mission: to move to Totatiche as Vicar and Professor of the small Seminary that was there. Only a few months he was in his first seat as a priest. With the idea nailed in his heart to make La Estanzuela a Fixed Vicariate, he began the procedures to convert it to that category. At the beginning of 1917, Fr. José de Jesús Angulo y Navarro was appointed Chaplain of La Estanzuela. On December 25, the creation of the new vicarage was authorized and December 26, 1917, the Bishop of Guadalajara signed the Decree of Fixed Vicariate where La Estanzuela was located, but at the proposal of the until then Chaplain, that old community would be San Francisco de Asís and piggybacking on a huge commitment: to build a large church, the pride of all the parishioners.
The young priest José de Jesús Angulo had not wasted a single minute to realize his dream, because on December 25, once the Bishop's authorization was known, he mounted his horse Alazán and traveled with those who were to be the donors of the land to build the great material work of the parish: the Temple of San Francisco de Asís.
Without money, but with a strong will and unusual charisma, Father José de Jesús Angulo y Navarro organized the residents to provide all kinds of tasks for the construction of the temple, led by Jerónimo Gutiérrez, originally from the vicinity of La Estanzuela , was the architect, teacher and executor of the parish church.
In addition to the beautiful temple, Father José de Jesús Angulo y Navarro inherited two schools from his community, one for girls and one for boys; the Curato, a car for the parish priest, a light plant, roads to the rancherías and 6000 people with a blind faith in their religion.
The Cristero Revolution
1926-1929
The transfiguration of José de Jesús Angulo y Navarro to José del Valle
During the government of Don Venustiano Carranza there were great differences between the clergy and their constitutional provisions of article 3 and 130, whose contempt earned them exile to several bishops and the reduction of ministers dedicated to worship.
After one difference after another between the clergy and the State, on January 7, 1926 Plutarco Elías Calles requested and obtained extraordinary powers from the Chambers to reform the Penal Code as regards religious matters.
As of February 22, 1926, schools and seminaries had begun to close and by April 1926, 200 Spanish priests had already been expelled. On June 14 of the same year, Calles authorized the publication of the Penal Code, known as "Calles Law" or 515, which unleashed a conflict between both entities that became known as: "The Cristero War or the Cristiada"
To the cry of Long live Christ the King! The individuals closest to the church gathered and it was precisely in San Francisco de Asís that the first revolutionary hosts, self-named Soldiers of Christ, departed.

In June 1926, Father José de Jesús Angulo y Navarro went to definitively dedicate the dedication to the Temple of San Francisco de Asís and on the 27th after Holy Mass he gave the blessing to those who had decided to form the defense army of your religious freedom.
The Altos de Jalisco region, Tepatitlán, Zapotlanejo, Juanacatlán, Tototlán, Atotonilco and Hacienda del Valle were areas of fierce persecution against priests and people close to the church. Due to the persecution of the clergy and being Father Angulo and Navarro in the center of the whirlwind, he decided to change his name to avoid being apprehended,
since then, he named himself “José del Valle”, the name by which he was known in Abasolo, Santo Tomás Huatzindeo, Apaseo el Alto, Tabasco, Tlalpujahuilla and the entire region.
Due to his personal safety and given his closeness to the leaders of the Cristiada, Don José del Valle was commissioned to the Parish of Abasolo, Guanajuato, where he was officiating the sacraments of the Catholic Church in the surrounding towns, protected by people from the place.
In 1928 Father José del Valle was spiritual director in the Parish of San Francisco de Asís and when his parishioners were all joy, he received news that would fill him with joy and spiritual commitments: the Archbishops of Mexico Don José Mora y del Río ; from Guadalajara Don Francisco Orozco y Jiménez and from Morelia Don Leopoldo Ruiz y Flores named him Missionary Father, a position he had to face in full religious persecution.
Between 1929 and 1935, Father José del Valle toured various states in his work of evangelization, as he did his apostolate in the states of Michoacán (Mil Cumbres), Guanajuato (Abasolo, Santo Tomás Huatzindeo) and Nuevo León.
At the dawn of 1936, Father José del Valle traveled through the towns of Tlalpujahua, Tlacotepec, San Francisco de los Reyes and Santa María de los Ángeles, Mich., Doing his work as a spiritual missionary for the settlers and when he played the last of the Villages in their evangelizing mission, Tlalpujahuilla, there was a communion between residents and priest that would unite them and that will be perpetuated through the years and perhaps centuries.
The Missionary Father José del Valle traveled the entire demarcation on the back of spirited horses, among pines, maguey trees, streams and mountains and perhaps as the days went by he was forging what would be another of his colossal works: the Sanctuary of the Virgin of San Juan de los Lagos in Tlalpujahuilla.
During his missionary work, he commented to the people of the need to build a temple that would worthily honor the Lord, but that for such an adventure he required the participation of the people. Summoned to a first meeting, the villagers let him know of the poverty of the inhabitants, the lack of available resources, but that they were willing and that he could count on the participation of all the families.
They were made together; Different appointments were granted, among which was Mr. Gregorio Mendoza who, given his ability to work the quarry, would be the architect of the project and teacher of the young apprentices.
Initially, the old chapel was demolished and on July 1, 1936, Father José del Valle pointed out and blessed the land where the Sanctuary to the Virgin of San Juan de los Lagos would be built.
Organized in crews and by tasks, the foundations were made; with picks, shovels, barrows and boats the men looked like armies of ants working tirelessly; employees of the Las Dos Estrellas mining company also joined the project.
After two years, seven months and seventeen days from June 1, 1936, the date on which the foundation of the temple began, on January 17, 1939, Don José del Valle delivered an eloquent speech in which he asserted:
"This date will remain in the history of Tlalpujahuilla, as the memorable day of the start of the works of the Sanctuary of Our Lady of San Juan de los Lagos" for which he summoned the entire community and Don Francisco Piedad Martínez so that on behalf of the population will lay the first stone.
During its construction, there were events that some mention as miraculous, such as the appearance at the edge of the foundations, of a spring that seems inexhaustible and that since its discovery to date is known as "El Posito de la Virgen".
In February 1943, Father José del Valle received the appointment of Apostolic Administrator to govern the Diocese of Villahermosa, Tabasco, a land that was still suffering the ravages of a character who had become one of the greatest enemies of the Catholic religion. : Governor Tomás Garrido Canabal, who within his brutalities had ordered the cathedral to be demolished. During the mandate of this ruler he had ordered the demolition of all the churches, persecuting all the priests and all the Catholic faithful had them intimidated with brutal threats.
That was the panorama that was kept as the next mission to Father José del Valle.
Father del Valle fulfilled his first mission in Tabasco until June 2, 1945, the date on which he was praised as Bishop of the diocese, whose consecration as VIII Bishop of Tabasco was officially given on July 29, 1945.
While both in Tlalpujahuilla the dome of the Sanctuary was built, in the image of the Basilica of San Pedro in Rome that began to be built on April 5, 1942 and was completed on July 15, 1946 and as at that time Father José del Valle was Bishop of Tabasco, he was invited to bless her on June 29, 1946.
A man of great virtues, with divine inspiration and projects for others unattainable, he proposed to build in Tabasco, the tallest towers that any cathedral could have in our country. For this feat, he took Don Gregorio Mendoza, the architect of the Sanctuary of Tlalpujahuilla who had worked in the Sanctuary of the Virgin of San Juan de los Lagos next to Don Goyo and God wanted to fulfill his desire to have what he longed for: the tallest towers of its cathedral, with a height of 70 meters, higher than the Cathedral of Puebla and the Metropolitan Cathedral of Mexico City, but unfortunately the conclusion of its sacred enclosure had to contemplate it from the sky,
Father José del Valle in Apaseo el Alto
On January 6, 1896, the construction of the Temple of the Sacred Heart began at the request of Father Santos María Carbajal, but the poverty of the people was greater than their dream of having a temple to match. of his town and his people.
At the beginning of the 20th century, Father Aureliano Baeza was in the Fixed Vicarage of San Andrés, who made unsuccessful efforts to have a larger temple but had not found a way to solve the lack of material resources.
On Sunday, February 2, 1941, a young priest arrived in the town of Apaseo el Alto who received from Father Aureliano Baeza the pending completion and the most rugged of all was the expansion of the Temple of San Andrés.
Perhaps at the beginning Father Joaquín Soto accepted Father Baeza's proposal to expand the Temple of San Andrés by building two aisles and forget about the resumption of the works of the Temple of the Sacred Heart that were in ruins and abandoned at that time. But the town of Apaseo el Alto was about to receive a blessing.
Father Francisco Aguilera, Parish Priest of Tlalpujahua received from Miss María Guadalupe Núñez, a virtuous lady closely linked to the needs of the church, a request endorsed by the Vicar Joaquín Soto Armenta, so that through his mediation Father José del Valle could go to the town from Apaseo el Alto to the traditional Misiones;
Father José del Valle was in Apaseo el Alto from July 8 to 16, 1941, a period in which the Sanctuary of Tlalpujahuilla was under construction.
People remember the word of the Lord of the Valley, the Missionary Father. Eloquent in his words, full of messages that anyone understood and with a manly voice that echoed off the walls, he always kept the faithful expectant.
When Father Joaquín Soto explained to the Lord of the Valley his intention to expand the Temple of San Andrés, the Missionary Father looked at him with his beautiful blue eyes and firmly asked him where the efforts of the residents who had started the new temple would remain, because I knew that they were all very poor but hard-working.
Father Soto argued that poverty was the main impediment and that it was practically impossible to raise funds for the purchase of materials and the payment of labor wages.
Father José del Valle explained in great detail the organization through tasks, the way to bring the stone, the sand, the extraction of the abundant lime from the surroundings, the water from the springs that flowed throughout the town and that were a blessing. Regarding the payment of the wages, he told him that God would not forsake him, that he had faith and that he would contact him with teachers to take the architectural project and also teach them the trade to work the quarry, but that he should start immediately.
On August 14, 1941, in a meeting with the residents, they decided to resume the construction of the temple, but not without first appointing a Pro-Works Committee, whose maximum responsibility fell to Don Juan Clímaco Tinajero Cervantes and thus, before the end of the assembly, they managed to reunite the Amount of $ 29.00 as the first fund for the epic work.
October 7, 1941 was the memorable date for the resumption of the works, many young Apaseoaltenses offered to work and teach themselves how to work the quarry. Father José del Valle spoke with experienced stonemasons who worked in the Sanctuary of Tlalpujahuilla so that they would come to support Father Soto, who promptly responded to the call of Father del Valle.
Father Joaquín Soto went to La Piedad and got another handful of workers from the quarry, who came under the command of Don Martín Ayala.
They were days of work carried out by men who seemed not to require rest; Epifanio Martínez was in charge of the masonry laborers, and Don Martín of the quarry laborers, while Father Joaquín made frequent contacts with Father José del Valle to continue giving him wise advice. Father José del Valle was the guide and star of Father Soto, who tried to emulate every action of Father Missionary.
The marvelous church of the Sacred Heart of Jesus was gradually taking shape and in each blessing that was given, Father Soto invited Father José del Valle to give him the holy blessing. This is how Father del Valle was in Apaseo el Alto on January 6, 1946 on the occasion of the 50th anniversary of the laying of the first stone of the Temple of the Sacred Heart, the blessing of the dome and the High Altar.
Father del Valle, with great charisma and personality, because those who knew him said that he was easily confused among the people of the towns: he dressed as the settlers did, in the time of the Cristiada he rode every day on horseback, his pistol on his belt , his hat in the purest country style and with an unequaled power of conviction.
He was a true soldier of Christ ... he did not die like many martyrs of his time because God had in store for him many material and spiritual works with the congregation who had the fortune to know him.